In algebraic topology, a branch of mathematics, Moore space is the name given to a particular type of topological space that is the homology analogue of the Eilenberg–Maclane spaces of homotopy theory, in the sense that it has only one nonzero homology (rather than homotopy) group.

Formal definition
Given an abelian group G and an integer n ≥ 1, let X be a CW complex such that

and

Then X is said to be a Moore space. Also, X is by definition simply-connected if n>1.

Examples

See also 
 Eilenberg–MacLane space, the homotopy analog.
 Homology sphere

References

Hatcher, Allen. Algebraic topology, Cambridge University Press (2002), . For further discussion of Moore spaces, see Chapter 2, Example 2.40. A free electronic version of this book is available on the author's homepage.

Algebraic topology